Kwame Moses (born 27 August 2002) is a Ghanaian professional footballer who plays as a defender for Ghanaian Premier League side Ashanti Gold.

Career 
Moses previously plied his trade with Dansoman-based club Bechem United before joining Ashanti Gold. He made 8 league appearances in 2 seasons with the club before the league was put on hold and later cancelled due to the COVID-19 pandemic. In September 2020, he was signed by the Obuasi-based club Ashanti Gold along with fellow Bechem United player, Yaw Annor, to bolster their squad ahead of the 2020–21 Ghana Premier League and the 2020–21 CAF Confederation Cup. He was included in the club's squad for 2020–21 CAF Confederation Cup.

References

External links 

 
 

Living people
2002 births
Association football defenders
Ghanaian footballers
Bechem United F.C. players
Ashanti Gold SC players